Mike Machette (born January 27, 1951) is a former professional tennis player from the United States. He enjoyed most of his tennis success while playing doubles. During his career, he finished runner-up at three doubles events.

Career finals

Doubles runners-up (3)

External links
 
 

American male tennis players
People from Belvedere, California
Tennis people from California
1951 births
Living people